Kohban (also Romanized as Kohbān; also known as Kahbanān and Kamanbān) is a village in Garmeh-ye Jonubi Rural District, in the Central District of Meyaneh County, East Azerbaijan Province, Iran. At the 2006 census, its population was 774, in 173 families.

References 

Populated places in Meyaneh County